Abdullahabad Halt railway station is located in Sindh, Pakistan.

See also
 List of railway stations in Pakistan
 Pakistan Railways

References

Railway stations in Sindh
Railway stations on Hyderabad–Khokhrapar Branch Line